Henry (Harry) Jocelyn Seymour, 9th Marquess of Hertford DL (born 6 July 1958) is a British peer, the son of Hugh Seymour, 8th Marquess of Hertford. He was educated at Harrow School and the Royal Agricultural College, Cirencester. He currently resides at Ragley Hall, Warwickshire, where he has been in charge of the estate since 1991.

He was a member of the House of Lords from 1997 to 1999 and is a Deputy Lieutenant of Warwickshire.

Family life
In 1990, he married Brazilian-born Beatriz Karam. They have four children:

 Lady Gabriella Helen Seymour (b. 1992)
 William Francis Seymour, Earl of Yarmouth (b. 2 November 1993). He married Kelsey Wells and they have two sons: Clement Andrew, Viscount Beauchamp (b. 2019) and The Honourable Jocelyn William (b. 2021)
Lord Edward George Seymour (b. 1995)
Lady Antonia Louisa Seymour (b. 1998)

Arms

References

External links

Henry Seymour, 9th Marquess of Hertford

1958 births
Living people
Henry
People from Warwickshire
People educated at Harrow School
Alumni of the Royal Agricultural University
21st-century British landowners
21st-century British farmers
Deputy Lieutenants of Warwickshire
9

Hertford